Chrysallida gubbiolii is a species of sea snail, a marine gastropod mollusk in the family Pyramidellidae, the pyrams and their allies. The species is one of a number within the genus Chrysallida.

References

External links
 To Encyclopedia of Life
 To World Register of Marine Species

gubbiolii
Gastropods described in 1998